Megachile leucopogonata is a species of bee in the family Megachilidae. It was described by Dours in 1873.

References

Leucopogonata
Insects described in 1873